"That Wasn't Me" is a song by American recording artist Brandi Carlile. The song serves as the lead single off Carlile's fourth studio album, Bear Creek.

Background
The song's lyrics were inspired by the addiction and recovery of one of Carlile's friends while the style was influenced by Elton John, The Beatles and Sheryl Crow.   
The song is written from the viewpoint of the addict, and addresses the healing process and reconciliation that comes with overcoming addiction.

On March 19, 2012, "That Wasn't Me" was announced along with Carlile's fourth studio album via her official website. The announcement stated that the single would be sent to radios soon. On March 26, via social networking site Twitter, Carlile "tweeted" the single cover and announced that the single would be released online on April 3.

The single's music video features Kris Kristofferson portraying the role of the addict.

Chart performance

References

External links
 BrandiCarlile.com — official site
 "That Wasn't Me" on Paste
Brandi Carlile on "NPR"

2012 singles
2011 songs
Columbia Records singles
Brandi Carlile songs
Songs written by Brandi Carlile